My Dusty Road is a 4 CD box set of Woody Guthrie music containing 54 tracks and a book. It is a collection of the newly discovered Stinson master discs. It was released by Rounder Records in  2009.

Discovering the Stinson Masters
According to the album liner notes by Ed Cray and Bill Nowlin, the master discs were housed in the basement of the Brooklyn apartment of Lucia Sutera.

In June 2003, Boston music manager Micheal Creamer was informed by Jim Farrow that he had made contact with Mrs. Sutera, who had inherited a collection of recording masters from her friend Irene Harris.

Irene Harris died of a heart attack in 1999; she was the wife of Robert Harris, the son of the founder of Stinson records, Herbert Harris.  Harris had founded Stinson records in 1939 and during the 1940s, he had been in partnership with Moses Asch, the founder of Folkways Records in New York City.  During World War II, Stinson had helped Asch to procure shellac, the raw material for manufacturing 78 rpm records which was in short supply due to wartime restrictions.

Ultimately, the recordings of artists like Woody Guthrie, Lead Belly and The Almanac Singers were released under three different labels: Asch, Stinson and Disc.

When Moses Asch went bankrupt in 1947 with the Disc label, some master discs fell to Harris as part of the bankruptcy settlement.

In the years later Asch released the recordings of his artists under the Label Folkways. He also reissued several of the older recordings on his new label. But he could not use the Master discs which were released here for the first time.

Creating the Woody Guthrie recordings
The recordings represented in these Box were made in April and May 1944 in New York City. They were cut partly on aluminum discs or glass masters. The masters were never released on any Folkways or Smithsonian Folkways album. They have clearer sound than older compilations of Guthrie's recordings of that time.

The Box consists of 4 CDs:

 Woody's "Greatest" Hits
 Woody's Roots
 Woody the Agitator
 Woody, Cisco, and Sonny Jam the Blues, Hollers, and Dances

Track lists

Footnotes

References
 

Woody Guthrie albums
Rounder Records compilation albums
2009 compilation albums